Jason Nugent (born May 18, 1982) is a former Canadian football defensive back. He most recently played for the Calgary Stampeders of the Canadian Football League. He was drafted by the Edmonton Eskimos in the second round of the 2006 CFL Draft. He played college football at Rutgers.

External links
Calgary Stampeders bio

1982 births
Living people
Edmonton Elks players
Calgary Stampeders players
Canadian football defensive backs
Players of Canadian football from Ontario
Rutgers Scarlet Knights football players
Sportspeople from Scarborough, Toronto
Canadian football people from Toronto
Winnipeg Blue Bombers players